Muyaka is a settlement in Kenya's Central Province. It is located near the intersection of Limuru Road and Gitaru Road, about 2 km northwest of Kibagare.

References 

Populated places in Central Province (Kenya)